= List of Research Institutes, Centres and Units of the University of Galway =

The following is a list of Research Institutes, Centres and Units of the University of Galway.

== Designated Research Institutes ==
- Data Science Institute (DSI)
- Ryan Institute
- Whitaker Institute for Innovation and Societal Change
- Institute for Lifecourse and Society
- Moore Institute for Research in the Humanities and Social Studies

== Research Centres and Units ==
- Alimentary Glycoscience Research Cluster (AGRC)
- Apoptosis Research Centre
- Applied Optics Group
- Biodiversity and Bioresources Research Cluster
- BioEconomy Research Cluster
- Bioinformatics and Biostatistics Research Cluster
- Biomechanics Research Centre
- Built Environment and Smart Cities Research Cluster
- Centre for Neuroimaging and Cognitive Genomics (NICOG)
- Centre for Antique, Medieval, and Pre-Modern Studies (CAMPS)
- Centre for Applied Linguistics and Multilingualism (CALM)
- Centre for Astronomy (CfA)
- Centre for Chromosome Biology (CCB)
- Centre for Climate & Air Pollution Studies (C-CAPS)
- Centre for Creative Arts Research (CCAR)
- Centre for Crystallography
- Centre for Disability Law & Policy (CDLP)
- Centre for Drama, Theatre and Performance
- Centre for Economic Research on Inclusivity and Sustainability (CERIS)
- Centre for Economic and Social Research on Dementia (CESRD)
- Centre for Entrepreneurial Growth and Scaling (CEGS)
- Centre for Global Women's Studies
- Centre for International Development Innovation (CIDI)
- Centre for Irish Studies
- Centre for Landscape Studies
- Centre for Ocean Research and Exploration
- Centre for One Health
- Centre for Pain Research
- Centre for Photonics and Imaging
- Centre for the Investigation of Transnational Encounters (CITE)
- Centre for Microscopy and Imaging (CMI)
- Combustion Chemistry Centre
- CÚRAM Centre for Research in Medical Devices
- De Brún Centre for Mathematics
- Economic and Social Impact Research Cluster
- Energy Research Centre
- Galway Neuroscience Centre
- Geo-ENvironmental Engineering (GENE)
- Health Behaviour Change Research Group (HBCRG)
- Health Economics & Policy Analysis Centre (HEPAC)
- Health Promotion Research Centre
- HRB Clinical Research Facility Galway
- Huston School of Film & Digital Media
- Informatics Research Unit for Sustainable Engineering (IRUSE)
- Irish Centre for Autism and Neurodevelopmental Research (ICAN)
- Irish Centre for High End Computing (ICHEC)
- Irish Centre for Human Rights
- Irish Centre for Research in Applied Geosciences (iCRAG)
- Irish Centre for Social Gerontology (ICSG)
- Irish Centre for the Histories of Labour & Class (ICHLC)
- Modelling and Informatics Research Cluster
- Nanoscale Biophotonics
- National Centre for Laser Applications (NCLA)
- Palaeoenvironmental Research Unit
- Plant & AgriBiosciences Research Centre
- Plant & AgriBiosciences Research Centre (PABC)
- Power Electronics Research Centre (PERC)
- Regenerative Medicine Institute (REMEDI)
- Ryan Institute MaREI Galway
- Social Science Research Centre
- Socio Economic Marine Research Unit (SEMRU)
- Stokes Applied Research Cluster
- UNESCO Child and Family Research Centre
